The 2011 Copa Centroamericana was the eleventh edition of Copa Centroamericana (formerly known as the UNCAF Nations Cup), an international football championship for national teams affiliated with the Central American Football Union (UNCAF) of the CONCACAF region. It took place in Panama from January 14 to January 23, 2011. It was the second time for Panama to host the tournament. On January 23, 2011 Honduras won the cup by defeating Costa Rica 2-1 in the final. 
The top five teams from this tournament qualified for the 2011 CONCACAF Gold Cup. The group stage draw was conducted on September 2, 2010 in Panama City.

Participating nations 
All seven UNCAF members participated in the tournament:

Venue
All matches were played at Estadio Rommel Fernández in Panama City.

Squads

Group stage
Tiebreakers
 Greater number of points in matches between the tied teams.
 Greater goal difference in matches between the tied teams (if more than two teams finish equal on points).
 Greater number of goals scored in matches among the tied teams (if more than two teams finish equal on points).
 Greater goal difference in all group matches.
 Greater number of goals scored in all group matches.
 Drawing of lots.

All times are in local, Pamana Time (UTC−05:00).

Group A

Group B

Final stage
{{Round4-with third

|||2||0
|||1 (2)| (pen)|1 (4)

|||2||1

|||0 (4)| (pen)|0 (5)
}}Note:''' No extra time is played.

Fifth place match

Semifinals

Third place match

Final

Statistics

Goalscorers 
3 goals
 Rafael Burgos
 Marco Ureña
2 goals

 Jaime Alas
 Armando Cooper 

 Jorge Claros 
 Ramón Núñez

 Edwin Aguilar 

1 goal

 Daniel Jiménez 
 Orlando Jiménez 
 Elroy Smith 
 Celso Borges 
 Victor Núñez 
 Osael Romero 
 Deris Umanzor 
 

 Manuel León 
 Guillermo Ramírez 
 Gregory Ruiz 
 Marvin Chávez 
 Johnny Leverón 
 Emil Martínez
 Walter Martínez 

 Denis Espinoza 
 Félix Rodríguez 
 Roberto Brown 
 Blas Pérez 
 Luis Rentería 

Source

Awards 
Golden Ball:  Ramón Núñez (Honduras)
Golden Boot:  Rafael Burgos (El Salvador) &  Marco Ureña (Costa Rica)

References

External links 
  2011 Copa Centroamericana

 
2011 in Central American football
2011
2011
2010–11 in Salvadoran football
2010–11 in Costa Rican football
2010–11 in Honduran football
2010–11 in Guatemalan football
2010–11 in Nicaraguan football
2010–11 in Panamanian football
2010–11 in Belizean football
Copa Centroamericana